Jonathan Erlich and Andy Ram defeated Paul Hanley and Kevin Ullyett 7–6(7–4), 7–6(12–10) to secure the title.

Seeds

Draw

Draw

External links
 Doubles draw

Doubles